The Kappelberg, at 358 metres, is the highest hill in Rhenish Hesse in central Germany. It lies in the forest of Vorholz between Bechenheim, Orbis and Oberwiesen near the border with the Palatinate.

About 10 metres from the highest point is a large cairn of basalt rocks. In old illustrations the Kappelberg was also spelt Cappelberg, which presumably indicates that there may have been an old chapel at this site.

A community of interest from the participating villages was founded in May 2008 and the highest point in Rhenish Hesse, which was buried under thick undergrowth, was made accessible and signposted. In March 2009 a summit cross was erected at the top.

See also
 Rhenish-Hessian Hills

References

External links 
 The hidden "summit rock" – the Kappelberg, at 358 metres, is the highest hill in Rhenish Hesse in the main-rheiner dated 17 March 2007

Mountains and hills of Rhineland-Palatinate
Rhenish-Hessian Hills